Itsy Bitsy Spider is a 1992 American animated short film directed by Matthew O'Callaghan, written by Michael O'Donoghue and stars Frank Welker as the titular spider alongside Thora Birch, Jim Carrey and Andrea Martin. Based on the eponymous rhyme, the short film was released along with the film Bébé's Kids. It was rated PG by the MPAA for sci-fi cartoon violence.

It is a family-friendly version of The Terminator and RoboCop, and the pilot episode of the television series, which was aired on the USA Network to become a franchise.

Plot
A young country spider Itsy befriends Leslie McGroarty, a perky young city girl who takes piano lessons from the music teacher (incidentally, she learns to play the song) and her cat, Langston. When Itsy frightens the teacher, she calls the Exterminator, who tries to kill Itsy with the toxic machine blower, but it causes pain and destruction to the instructor's house, and the Exterminator turns out to be a heavily armed android. The Exterminator's method uses more extreme weapons, escalating from poison and vacuums to guns and explosives, and it destroys the instructor's house. Itsy finally reunites with Leslie (who senses to leave the house when the Exterminator uses the weapons) and head home to the big city with the bicycle.

Cast
 Frank Welker as Itsy, Langston the Cat and Mouse
 Thora Birch as Leslie McGroarty
 Jim Carrey as The Exterminator (credited as James Carrey)
 Andrea Martin as Music Teacher

References

External links
 
 Itsy Bitsy Spider at the TCM Movie Database
 

1992 short films
1992 animated films
1992 films
1990s American animated films
1990s animated short films
1992 comedy films
1992 fantasy films
1990s science fiction films
American children's animated comic science fiction films
American children's animated science fantasy films
American fantasy comedy films
American animated short films
American slapstick comedy films
Android (robot) films
Films about spiders
Films based on nursery rhymes
Films scored by David Newman
Paramount Pictures short films
Short films directed by Matthew O'Callaghan
Hyperion Pictures films
1990s English-language films
American comedy short films
American science fiction short films
Animated films about children